Boguszewo may refer to the following places:
Boguszewo, Kuyavian-Pomeranian Voivodeship (north-central Poland)
Boguszewo, Gmina Mońki in Podlaskie Voivodeship (north-east Poland)
Boguszewo, Gmina Trzcianne in Podlaskie Voivodeship (north-east Poland)
Boguszewo, Warmian-Masurian Voivodeship (north Poland)